Carmen Elizabeth Juanita Echo Sky Brava Cortez is a fictional character and the female protagonist of the Spy Kids franchise, portrayed by Alexa Vega in the film series, and voiced by Ashley Bornancin in the television series.

Biography
For most of her life, Carmen had no idea her parents were secretly spies. Carmen's main concern was with Juni, whom she felt she was unfairly forced to babysit. She responded by treating Juni in a mean way. However, Carmen was also hiding her own secrets: in addition to skipping school to go on outings to the city without her parents’ permission, she also had to deal with wearing diapers because of a bedwetting problem that she was desperate to hide from her brother.

Appearances

Spy Kids
In the first Spy Kids film, Carmen and Juni discover the truth about their parents when they are kidnapped. Though Carmen and Juni fight with each other throughout their adventure, the two of them bond and form a rapport of mutual respect. Carmen is also influenced by her real uncle Machete, who let her know that he had the same problem with his younger brother, Carmen's father. She also finds out that her brother had always been aware of her nighttime bedwetting and had kept that knowledge to himself on her mother's instructions. Carmen also develops a sense of family, and insists that if any Cortez become involved in missions, then all of them should.

Spy Kids 2: The Island of Lost Dreams
By Spy Kids 2: The Island of Lost Dreams, Carmen has stopped calling her brother names, and they are able to work better as a team. However, problems still arise between them from a romantic interest Carmen develops in Gary Giggles. Gary has mixed emotions for Carmen. At some events, it is evident that he likes her, and at some events, it looks as if he doesn't, like when he refers to her to Juni as “your dork sister”. Juni tries to convince Carmen that Gary is trouble, but to no avail. Later, Carmen, after a conversation with Gary's little sister Gerti, changes her mind about Gary and convinces Gerti to turn against her father, who has an evil plan for world domination.

Spy Kids 3-D: Game Over
In Spy Kids 3-D: Game Over, Carmen, an experienced hacker, goes on a quest to shut down the Toymaker's evil video game Game Over, which enslaves its users. However, she makes it only as far as Level 4, before being kidnapped and held hostage by the Toymaker, where she is tickle tortured until her rescue. Juni comes to her rescue and they continue on her quest to shut down the game. Carmen is absent for most of the movie, and she only appears near the film's climax and her scenes in captivity.

Spy Kids: All the Time in the World
In Spy Kids: All the Time in the World Carmen appears as a supporting character. Carmen and Juni provide guidance to the new agents, Rebecca and Cecil. During the gap between the 3rd and 4th film, Juni left the O.S.S., leaving Carmen feeling abandoned and betrayed. When he returns during the film, the two are extremely hostile toward each other (much like they were in the first film), before eventually reconciling and becoming a team again. Carmen and Juni reopen the Spy Kids program as its new co-directors. The enemy is "The Timekeeper", who wants Rebecca's necklace so he can travel back in time to spend more time with his father. Rebecca and Cecil stop him and encourage him to be good.

Spy Kids: Mission Critical
Ashley Bornancin replaced Vega in the role of Carmen in the animated series Spy Kids: Mission Critical in a main capacity. The series follows Carmen and Juni as they train and lead a team of fellow Spy Kids cadets against the forces of S.W.A.M.P. (Sinister Wrongdoers Against Mankind's Preservation) and their diabolical leader, Golden Brain.

References

Spy Kids characters
Child characters in film
Fictional secret agents and spies
Fictional Hispanic and Latino American people
Film characters introduced in 2001
Fictional female secret agents and spies